Chelsea is a suburb in Melbourne, Victoria, Australia, 30 km south-east of Melbourne's Central Business District, located within the City of Kingston local government area.

Chelsea is located on Port Phillip and is the most important bayside suburban centre between Mordialloc and Frankston. Chelsea is very popular with beachgoers during summer.  Also popular is Bicentennial Park, located about 1 km inland on the site of a former rubbish tip. It has recently been redeveloped with modern barbecue and play equipment, most notably the Mount Chelsea adventure playground.

The Frankston railway line first cut through the Chelsea area in 1882 and Chelsea station was opened in 1907, as was the Chelsea Post Office. These facilities served a modest slowly growing population before most of the Chelsea area was developed post-World War II. Many houses were demolished to make way for single storey units in the 1960s and 1970s. Chelsea has smaller households, fewer families with children and more elderly people than most other Melbourne suburbs.

The Chelsea Magistrates' Court closed on 1 February 1985.

Chelsea has its own railway station on the Frankston line.

Chelsea is also home to many church, community and sporting organisations. The town has an Australian Rules football team competing in the Mornington Peninsula Nepean Football League. AFL legend Leigh Matthews played his junior football at the Chelsea Football Club.

Golfers play at the Australasian Golf Club's Chelsea Public Golf Course on Fraser Avenue in neighbouring Edithvale.

See also
 City of Chelsea – Chelsea was previously within this former local government area.

References

External links
 

Suburbs of Melbourne
Suburbs of the City of Kingston (Victoria)
Port Phillip